Back to Mono (1958–1969) is a box set that compiles tracks produced by American record producer Phil Spector between 1958 to 1969. It was released in 1991 by ABKCO. Initially a vinyl album-sized package, the box contained a booklet with photographs, complete song lyrics, discographical information, and a reproduction of the essay on Spector by Tom Wolfe, "The First Tycoon of Teen." The package also contained a small, round, red "Back to Mono" pin.

Content
Back to Mono surveys recordings leading up to and featuring the Wall of Sound, Spector's famed production trademark. Starting with "He's A Rebel" on disc one, through "I'll Never Need More Than This" and including disc four, all of the musical arrangements are by Jack Nitzsche. The list of musicians contributing to the tracks number in the hundreds, but prominent among them are Brian Wilson, Hal Blaine, Sonny Bono, Red Callender, Glen Campbell, Al DeLory, Steve Douglas, Jim Gordon, Jim Horn, Carol Kaye, Barney Kessel, Larry Knechtel, Jay Migliori, Ray Pohlman, Don Randi, Lyle Ritz, Billy Strange, Tommy Tedesco, Bill Pitman, and Nino Tempo.

The set collects every single produced by Spector and issued on the Philles label, with the exception of Philles 132, "White Cliffs of Dover" by The Righteous Brothers, which did not chart. Of the catalogue items Philles 100 through 136, the set omits: Philles 101, 103, and 104, produced by Spector's early business partner and label namesake, Lester Sill; Philles 133, produced by Jeff Barry, although its B-side produced by Spector, "When I Saw You," does appear; and Philles 134, produced by Bob Crewe. Philles 105, withdrawn initially in 1962 owing to its controversial subject matter, has also been included. Both "Walking in the Rain" by The Ronettes and "Stumble and Fall" by Darlene Love are listed in most discographies, including the box booklet, as Philles 123. The single "Christmas (Baby Please Come Home)," initially released in 1963 as Philles 119, was re-released the following year as Philles 125 with a different B-side, and did not chart either year. Philles 134 through 136 were not released in the United States; however, there are DJ promo pressings of 136.

In addition to the Philles singles catalogue, the first three discs present Spector productions for other labels, various unreleased material, and two album tracks from Presenting the Fabulous Ronettes featuring Veronica, Philles 4006, and one from River Deep - Mountain High, London HAU 8298 (unreleased Philles 4011). Spector created additional imprints for specific projects, such as the Phil Spector label to promote the solo career of Veronica "Ronnie" Bennett of the Ronettes, the future Mrs. Spector. Some of those items also appear on these discs.

The fourth disc contains the entirety of the holiday album released on the same day as the JFK assassination, A Christmas Gift for You, purportedly the only long-playing album from his Philles heyday that Spector worked on with the same intensity that he generally lavished on the singles. It peaked at #13 on the Christmas Albums chart in 1963, although a reissue in 1972 went to #6.

In 2003, the album was ranked #64 on Rolling Stone magazine's list of the 500 greatest albums of all time (#65 on revised 2012 list and #489 on the revised 2020 list). With the exception of an anthology of his productions for the girl group the Paris Sisters, Back to Mono represents the totality of Spector's singles from this period in print, as of Spring, 2007.

Track listing
All selections produced by Phil Spector, except "Spanish Harlem" produced by Jerry Leiber and Mike Stoller

Disc One

Disc Two

Disc Three

Disc Four: A Christmas Gift for You
Initially released as Philles 4005, November 22, 1963

Certifications

References

1991 compilation albums
Phil Spector
ABKCO Records compilation albums
Albums produced by Phil Spector
Albums recorded at Gold Star Studios